Turks and Caicos Islands competed in the 2014 Commonwealth Games in Glasgow, Scotland from 23 July to 3 August 2014.

Athletics

Men
Track & road events

Field Events

Key
Note–Ranks given for track events are within the athlete's heat only
Q = Qualified for the next round
q = Qualified for the next round as a fastest loser or, in field events, by position without achieving the qualifying target
NR = National record
N/A = Round not applicable for the event

Weightlifting

Men

References

Nations at the 2014 Commonwealth Games
Turks and Caicos Islands at the Commonwealth Games
2014 in the Turks and Caicos Islands